Arna may refer to:

People
 Arna Bontemps (1902–1973), African-American poet, novelist, librarian, and member of the Harlem Renaissance
 Arna Mer-Khamis (1929–1995), Israeli Jewish political and human rights activist
 Arna Selznick, Canadian director and artist, known for directing Nelvana's 1985 animated film The Care Bears Movie
 Arna Sif Pálsdóttir (born 1988), Icelandic team handball player
 Arna Vågen (1905–2005), Norwegian missionary and politician for the Christian Democratic Party
 Lissy Arna (1900–1964), German film actress

Places
 Arna (municipality), a former municipality in Hordaland county, Norway (now part of Bergen)
 Arna, Greece, a village in Laconia, Peloponnesus, peninsular Greece
 Arna, Norway, a borough in the city of Bergen, Norway
 Arna-Bjørnar, an association football club
 Arna Township, Pine County, Minnesota, a township in Pine County, Minnesota
 Diocese of Arna, an ancient city and former bishopric, now Civitella d'Arna frazione in Perugia city, and a Latin Catholic titular see
 Indre Arna and Ytre Arna, two neighboring villages in the municipality of Bergen in Norway

Other
 Arna (moth), a genus of moths in the subfamily Lymantriinae
 Arna (publication), a journal of the Faculty of Arts, University of Sydney
 Ärna (or Uppsala Airport), an airport northwest of Uppsala, Sweden
 Arna Church, a church in the city of Bergen, Norway
 Arna Station, a railway station in the city of Bergen, Norway
 Arna Tunnel, a proposed road tunnel in Norway
 Alfa Romeo Arna, a type of Italian car